The First Expedition to Badr ( ghazwa Safawān) or the Preliminary Badr Invasion occurred in year 2 AH of the Islamic calendar, in Rabi ul Awal (September 623). Kurz ibn Jabir al-Fihri raided Muslim territory and stole pasturing camels belonging to Madinah. Muhammad was a three days distance away. Muhammad mobilized 70 men. By the time Muhammad reached the valley of Safawan, al-Fihri fled. Once they passed Al Haja, they proceed to al Kut, also known today as Kuwait.

See also
List of expeditions of Muhammad

Notes

625
Campaigns led by Muhammad
Safwan